The 1991–92 season was the 83rd year of football played by Dundee United, and covers the period from 1 July 1991 to 30 June 1992. United finished in fourth place in what was Jim McLean's penultimate season as manager.

Match results
Dundee United played a total of 49 competitive matches during the 1991–92 season. The team finished fourth in the Scottish Premier Division.

In the cup competitions, United lost in the fourth round of the Tennent's Scottish Cup to Celtic and lost in the Skol Cup quarter-finals to eventual finalists Dunfermline.

Legend

All results are written with Dundee United's score first.

Premier Division

Tennent's Scottish Cup

Skol Cup

Player details
During the 1991–92 season, United used 27 different players comprising six nationalities. For the second successive season, Maurice Malpas was the only player to play in every match. The table below shows the number of appearances and goals scored by each player.

|}

Goalscorers
United had 18 players score with the team scoring 78 goals in total. The top goalscorer was Duncan Ferguson, who finished the season with 16 goals.

Discipline
During the 1991–92 season, two United players were sent off. Statistics for cautions are unavailable.

Team statistics

League table

Transfers

In
The club signed five players during the season with a total public cost of nearly £400,000. In addition, one player played whilst on trial but left shortly afterwards.

Out
Four players were sold by the club during the season with a public total of £1.15m. The club made a profit of around £750k from transfers during the season.

Playing kit

The jerseys were sponsored by Belhaven for the fifth and penultimate season.

See also
1991–92 in Scottish football

References

External links
Glenrothes Arabs 1991–92 season review

Dundee United F.C. seasons
Dundee United